The BT Tower, formerly known as the Post Office Tower and the GPO Tower, is a landmark and telecommunications tower in Birmingham, England. It is the tallest structure in the city. Its post office code was YBMR.

History

The first microwave telecommunications relay in Birmingham, set up in 1949, utilised a metal tower on the roof of Telephone House, a 1930s building near to the eventual site of the BT Tower, and also on Lionel Street.

Construction of the BT Tower commenced in July 1963 and was completed in September 1965. The tower became operational in December 1966 and was officially opened by the Lord Mayor of Birmingham, Alderman James S. Meadows, on 5 October 1967. It was designed by the Ministry of Public Building and Works and M.H. Bristow was the senior architect. It has 26 storeys, housing technical areas and offices, and five levels of circular aerial galleries at the top. There is a roof-mounted crane.

The original intention was to build a circular tower similar to the London one but without the public floors above the aerial galleries. This was refused in order to avoid non-standard procedures for aircraft approaching Birmingham Airport from the north-west. The square design, as built, was proposed for aesthetic reasons by the Chief Architect of the Ministry of Public Building and Works.

The tower was designed to be stable in high winds. Channels at each corner funnel the wind to counteract the force of the wind swaying the structure. A stable platform is necessary so that the microwave dishes mounted on the side of the structure keep line of sight with the remote transmitter they are communicating with.

There were two steel rails on one wall on which a trolley was designed to run to carry the dishes up to the aerial galleries. The original horn dishes were too heavy for the roof mounted crane to lift and had to be stripped down, even in this state they were only just under the crane's maximum load capacity.

The ability to lift dishes was dependent on the weather and to complicate matters, the steel rails only went to the bottom of the first aerial gallery. To get the dishes higher a steel cable system was used that was mounted on poles. When the trolley reached the aerial gallery it had to be disconnected from the rails and swung out to attach to the cables.

In August 2003, the tower was painted an ultramarine blue to cover the existing light brown which had started to discolour. The balconies were painted a dark shade of blue. On 18 March 2004, local comedian Jasper Carrott switched on the night-time illuminations of the tower in response to Birmingham City Council's policy of encouraging the illumination of local landmarks.

The tower is home to a pair of peregrines, with a webcam installed in 2010.

On 5 February 2012, the last of the large analogue aerial dishes was removed following a migration to digital transmission. Around eighty smaller dishes remain.

In 2020, scaffolding surrounded the tower as the structure underwent some refurbishments. These improvements included removing older satellites and antennas that were no longer in use. This subsequently reduced the height of the overall tower from 152m to 140m. The refurbishment was completed in May 2022.

Floors

There are 24 equipment height floors ( in height), a Band Branching area (Floor 25) – the square section seen from outside, which is approximately double the normal floor height, followed by five aerial galleries.

Floor numbering used YBMR/A followed by the actual floor number +1, i.e. the Ground Floor was YBMR/A1 etc. The aerial galleries were labelled YBMR/B1-5.

See also
 List of tallest buildings and structures in Birmingham
 Anchor Exchange

References

External links
Skyscrapernews.com's entry
BT Tower Peregrine webcam
Birmingham's Hidden Spaces: BT Tower

Buildings and structures in Birmingham, West Midlands
Towers in the West Midlands (county)
Buildings and structures completed in 1966
British Telecom buildings and structures
Communication towers in the United Kingdom
1966 establishments in England